Dude Descending a Staircase is the fourth studio album by English electronic music group Apollo 440. It was released as a double album on 22 July 2003 via Stealth Sonic Recordings and Sony Music UK. Recording sessions took place at Apollo Control in Camden, London. Production was handled by Apollo 440 and Stuart Crichton. It features guest appearances from Jay Dunne, Pete Wylie, Spoonface, The Beatnuts and Tommy Blaize among others. Its title and cover art reference the painting Nude Descending a Staircase by Marcel Duchamp.

The album's lead single and a title track peaked at number 58 on the UK Singles Chart.

Critical reception
In his review for The Guardian, Adam Sweeting gave the album four out of five starts, writing: "Keen Liverpool FC supporters and pioneers of Brit electro, Apollo 440 come bounding back with a vast double CD that nobody could accuse of failing to deliver value for money. Where the band score is in their ability to blur the line between people and machinery: time and again you are left wondering whether that was a drummer or a drum machine, a pianist or merely another sample. The 18 tracks here cover a bit of everything, from speedy dance-pop with shouting to ripped-to-shreds disco, leavened with intermittent blasts of old-fashioned hard rock. They seem particularly fond of giant 1970s soul grooves with massed banks of strings, as though they had been loading up on old Isaac Hayes and Temptations records. They could do a lot worse". On the other hand, Uncut stuff reviewer gave it 1.5 out of 5 writing "Kudos to Apollo 440 for the title and sleeve here, wry references to Marcel Duchamp which may sail over the heads of some. It's a juicy electric foray into retro-futurist funk, the cheesy, strobe-lit spirit of which is captured on titles like "Disco Sucks" and "Escape To Beyond The Planet Of The Super Apes", featuring guest appearances that include a shouty turn from Pete Wylie. The second disc is more of a laid-back, trippy affair?most enticing of the tracks on offer being "Something's Got To Give". Nice, though a few more moments of splashdown wouldn't go amiss".

Track listing

Sample credits
Track 1 contains elements from "When The Revolution Comes" written by Abiodun Oyewole
Track 5 contains elements from "People Get Up" written by Ricardo Williams
Track 10 reading from "Praised Be Man, fragment from San Francisco Blues" (1956) courtesy of Jack Kerouac
Track 11 contains elements from "Sweatheart" written by Pete Kessler and Denise Davis

Personnel

Howard Gray – producer
Trevor Gray – producer
Norman "Noko" Fisher-Jones – producer
Paul Kodish – drums
Cliff Hewitt – drums
Ewan MacFarlane – vocals (tracks: 3, 4, 14, 18), backing vocals
Ian "Mary Byker" Hoxley – backing vocals
Keith Holden – harmonica
Stan Francisco – saxophone
Stuart Crichton – backing vocals, cello, additional keyboards, programming, producer (tracks: 2, 3), additional producer (track 5)
Tommy Blaize – vocals (track 8), backing vocals
Andy Caine – backing vocals
Paul "Harry K." Colbourne – backing vocals
Kristine Pratt – whispering vocals
Jerry "JuJu" Tineo – vocals (track 1)
Lester "Psycho Les" Fernandez – vocals (track 1)
Jalal "Lightnin' Rod" Nuriddin – vocals (tracks: 2, 9)
Jay Dunne – vocals (track 5)
Pete Wylie – vocals (track 6)
Jack Kerouac – vocals (track 10)
Lisa "Xan" Lindley-Jones – vocals (track 11)
Elizabeth Gray – vocals (track 12), backing vocals
Elroy "Spoonface" Powell – vocals (track 16)
Chris Conway – recording (track 1)
Ashley Krajewski – recording and mixing assistant
Andrew Nichols – mixing assistant
John Davis – mastering
Tom Sheehan – photography
Anthony Ausgang – painting
John Birchall – hair stylist

References

External; links

2003 albums
Apollo 440 albums
Albums produced by Stuart Crichton